The 1985 Wyoming Cowboys football team represented the University of Wyoming as a member of the Western Athletic Conference (WAC) during the 1985 NCAA Division I-A football season. Led by Al Kincaid in his fifth and final season as head coach, the Cowboys compiled a record of 3–8 overall and 2–6 in conference play, tying for seventh place in the WAC. The team played home games at War Memorial Stadium in Laramie, Wyoming.

Schedule

References

Wyoming
Wyoming Cowboys football seasons
Wyoming Cowboys football